Les Murdoch (born 1957), based in Bowraville, New South Wales, Australia is a contemporary artist who began painting in the mid-1990s.

Completely self-taught, Murdoch has developed his own style, and is recognized as the pioneer of a new movement of art: Aboriginal Op art Surrealism. The style is described as a combination of indigenous dot painting and op art illusions with surreal qualities.

As of 2008, Murdoch exclusively showed his work at the Bowraville Art Gallery. Describing Murdoch's work, gallery curator Darren Green has said “there is nothing else like it in this world."

Although not a qualified teacher, Les has also been involved in a mentor program through the Junuy's Aboriginal Youth Project where he has personally encouraged aboriginal youths to pursue their love for art.

References

1957 births
Australian artists
Living people